Adrian Vicente Yunta (born 11 June 1999) is a Spanish taekwondo athlete. He won the gold medal at the 2018 European Taekwondo Championships on the men's finweight category.

He won the gold medal in the men's 58 kg event at the 2022 Mediterranean Games held in Oran, Algeria.

References

External links
 

Spanish male taekwondo practitioners
Living people
1999 births
European Taekwondo Championships medalists
Taekwondo practitioners at the 2020 Summer Olympics
Competitors at the 2022 Mediterranean Games
Mediterranean Games gold medalists for Spain
Mediterranean Games medalists in taekwondo
Olympic taekwondo practitioners of Spain
21st-century Spanish people